Toothwort is a common name for several plants and may refer to:

Cardamine, a genus of plants in the mustard family, Brassicaceae
Lathraea, a genus of parasitic plants in the family Orobanchaceae native to Europe and Asia